Wisma Tun Fuad Stephens is a state government building located in the city of Kota Kinabalu, Sabah, Malaysia. It is named after the first Chief Minister of Sabah, Fuad Stephens.

Features 
The building become the first disabled-friendly building in the state of Sabah, providing facilities like a motorised wheelchair lift, parking lot, washroom and a special sliding door at the building entrance.

References 

Buildings and structures in Kota Kinabalu